Nikki Gemmell (born 1966) is a best-selling Australian author. She resides in Sydney, Australia.

Career
Gemmell is the author of fourteen works of fiction and seven non-fiction books. Her books have been translated into 22 languages.

Nikki was born in Wollongong, New South Wales, and attended Kincoppal-Rose Bay, Sydney, on a scholarship. She graduated from the University of Technology Sydney with a Masters in Writing and worked as a radio journalist for ABC Radio and the BBC World Service.

Her distinctive writing style, including her use of the second-person narrative, has gained her critical and popular acclaim. In France she has been described as a "female Jack Kerouac". In 2007, the French literary magazine Lire included her in a list of what it called the fifty most important writers in the world – those it believed would have a significant influence on the literature of the 21st century.

Her best-known work is the 2003 novel The Bride Stripped Bare, an explicit exploration of female sexuality, which was originally written and published anonymously. Gemmell was identified publicly as the author of The Bride Stripped Bare before publication. The book went on to become a worldwide publishing sensation and the best-selling book by an Australian author in 2003. In the wake of the success of Fifty Shades of Grey, it reentered the fiction charts in the UK in the summer of 2012. Two follow-up novels complete The Bride Stripped Bare trilogy: With My Body and I Take You.

She has also published two series of books for children, the Kensington Reptilarium and Coco Banjo series.

Gemmell pens a weekly column for The Weekend Australian newspaper.

In 2003 Gemmell also penned a weekly column for the Mail on Sunday in London which formed the basis of a compendium titled Pleasure: An Almanac for the Heart (2006).

In 2014 The Kensington Reptilarium was shortlisted for an Australian Book Industry Award in the category of Book of the Year for Older Children. In 1999 Cleave was shortlisted in the Fiction category of the Queensland Premier's Literary Awards. Four books by Gemmell, Shiver, Cleave, The Bride Stripped Bare and The Book of Rapture, made the longlist of "Favourite Australian Novels" as chosen by readers of the Australian Book Review.

Bibliography

Adult novels
 The Ripping Tree (2021)
 I Take You (2013)
 With My Body (2011)
 The Book of Rapture (2009)
 The Bride Stripped Bare (2003)
 Lovesong (2002)
 Cleave (1998); published as Alice Springs in the United States (1999)
 Shiver (1997)

For children
 The Luna Laboratorium (2015)
 The Icicle Illuminarium (2013)
 The Kensington Reptilarium (2013)
 Coco Banjo and the Super Wow Surprise (2016)
 Coco Banjo Has Been Unfriended (2015)
 Coco Banjo is Having a Yay Day (2015)

Non fiction
 Dissolve (2021)
 On Quiet (2018)
 After (2017; written in response to her mother's suicide)
 Personally – Further Notes on Life (2013)
 Honestly – Notes on Life (2012)
 Why You Are Australian – A Letter to My Children (2009)
 Pleasure: An Almanac of the Heart (2006), published as Plaisir : Un florilège du coeur in France (2011)

Anthologies
 Just Between Us: Australian Writers Tell The Truth About Female Friendship (Pan Macmillan Australia, 2013) Ed. Maya Linden, Christie Nieman, Maggie Scott, Natalie Kon-Yu, Miriam Sved
 Better than Fiction: True Travel Tales from Great Fiction Writers (Lonely Planet, 2012) Ed. Don George
 The Divided Heart: Art and Motherhood (Red Dog Books, 2012) Ed. Rachel Power
 Inside Notting Hill (Umbrella Books, 2007). Ed. Miranda Davies, Sarah Anderson
 Some Girls Do ... My Life as a Teenager (Arena, 2006) Ed. Jacinta Tynan
 Come Away With Me (Bantam, 2004) Ed. Sarah Macdonald
 Writers on Writing (Penguin Books Australia, 2004). Ed. Roberts, Barry Mitchell, Roger Zubrinich
 Australian Expats: Stories from Abroad (Global Exchange, 2003) Ed. Bryan Havenhand, Anne MacGregor
 Gas and Air: Tales of Pregnancy, Birth and Beyond (Bloomsbury UK, 2002). Ed. Jill Dawson, Margo Daly
 Neverland: What Australia Might Have Been (Pluto Press, 2002). Ed. Kevin Murray
 My One True Love (Random House Australia, 2000). Ed. Caro Llewellyn
 Australian Summer Stories (Penguin Australia, 1999)
 Partners (HarperCollins Australia, 1999). Ed. Ross Fitzgerald, Anne Henderson

References

External links
 Official website
 Review of The Bride Stripped Bare

1966 births
Living people
Australian women novelists
Australian expatriates in the United Kingdom
University of Technology Sydney alumni
People educated at Kincoppal School
Date of birth missing (living people)
Australian columnists
Australian women columnists
20th-century Australian novelists
20th-century Australian women writers